Ivan Douglas Gregory  DFC (13 January 1923 – 12 April 2015) was a Royal Air Force officer, who won the Distinguished Flying Cross during the Second World War, and later became the oldest stunt pilot in Britain.

References

External links
Julianlewis.net

1923 births
2015 deaths
Royal Air Force officers
Royal Air Force personnel of World War II
Recipients of the Distinguished Flying Cross (United Kingdom)
Military personnel from Southampton